This is a list of WPMF world champions, showing every female world champion certificated by the World Professional Muaythai Federation (WPMF). The WPMF, which is one of the major governing bodies in professional Muay Thai(Thai boxing), started certifying their own Muay Thai world champions in 17 different weight classes.

Welterweight

Super lightweight

Featherweight

Super bantamweight

Bantamweight

Flyweight

Light flyweight

Mini flyweight

Pinweight

See also
List of WPMF male world champions
List of WBC Muaythai world champions
List of IBF Muaythai world champions

References

Lists of Muay Thai champions
WPMF
Muay thai
Lists of women by occupation